Badalpura is a town in Patna district in the Indian state of Bihar. It is a part of Patna urban agglomeration. Badalpur has the lowest sex ratio in Bihar state (630 as against 1000 males) as per the 2011 census.

References

Neighbourhoods in Patna
Cities and towns in Patna district